Following are the statistics of the Libyan Premier League for the 1998–99 season.  The Libyan Premier League is the highest division of Libyan football championship, organised by Libyan Football Federation.  It was founded in 1963 and features mostly professional players.

Overview
It was contested by 16 teams, and Al Mahalah Tripoli won the championship.

Group stage

Group A

Group B

Playoff

Championship Group

Relegation Group

References
Libya - List of final tables (RSSSF)

Libyan Premier League seasons
1
Libya